Lebanon have participated three times at the AFC Asian Cup. Their first participation came in 2000, when they hosted the tournament after healing from the Lebanese Civil War. The 2019 edition was Lebanon's first participation via qualification. 

Historically, Lebanon was considered one of the weakest Asian teams in football, proven by qualification results and lack of participation in the tournament. Also, prior to the 2019 Asian Cup, they were the only Arab country, alongside Yemen, not to qualify to the Asian Cup through regular qualification. From the late 2010s, Lebanon's results improved. After having reached the final round of qualification for the 2014 FIFA World Cup, the team maintained a 15-game unbeaten streak from 2016 to 2018, and qualified for the 2019 Asian Cup undefeated in the third round of qualifications.

Lebanon have never qualified past the group stage in the Asian Cup, with them narrowly missing out on the knock-out stage in 2019 due to the fair play rule; both eliminations involved teams from Southeast Asia (Thailand in 2000 and Vietnam in 2019).

AFC Asian Cup record
Lebanon were unable to qualify past the first round in their two appearances at the AFC Asian Cup. After a 4–0 defeat to Iran in 2000, Abbas Chahrour scored Lebanon's first goal of the tournament against Iraq in a 2–2 draw. In 2019, after losing against Qatar and Saudi Arabia, Lebanon achieved their first Asian Cup win against North Korea (4–1). However, they missed out on the round of 16 as, in the third-place ranking, Vietnam had accumulated less yellow-cards than Lebanon.

2000 AFC Asian Cup
In 2000, Lebanon hosted the Asian Cup despite concerns by FIFA regarding the stadiums' conditions. Under coach Josip Skoblar, Lebanon, captained by Jamal Taha, were drawn into Group A alongside Iran, Iraq and Thailand; they finished last in the group with only two points; had Lebanon defeated Thailand in the final game, they would have qualified for the knockout stage as one of the best third-placed teams.

2019 AFC Asian Cup
On 9 January 2019, Lebanon played their first game against Qatar. In the 37th minute of play, Ali Hamam scored a goal for Lebanon only for it to be disallowed for a dubious foul on a Qatari player. In the second half, two goals by the opposition without reply gave them all three points from the encounter. Three days later, Lebanon lost to Saudi Arabia 2–0, sentencing Lebanon to their second defeat in the tournament. In the final group stage game, played on 17 January against North Korea, Lebanon won their first Asian Cup game 4–1 with goals by Felix Michel Melki, Hassan Maatouk and a brace by Hilal El-Helwe. However, this wasn't enough to qualify Lebanon to the knock-out stages, as they lost out to Vietnam in the third-place ranking on the fairplay rule.

Overview

Tournaments

Matches

Record players

Goalscorers

References

External links
Lebanon at the AFC

 
Countries at the AFC Asian Cup